Pycnotheca is a genus of hydroids in the family Kirchenpaueriidae.

Species
Three species are classified in this genus:
Pycnotheca biseptata  (Blackburn, 1938)
Pycnotheca mirabilis (Allman, 1883)
Pycnotheca producta (Bale, 1881)

References

Kirchenpaueriidae
Hydrozoan genera